Henrik Henriksen Beck was  a Danish geologist, conchologist and naturalist. He wrote Index molluscorum praesentis aevi musei principis augustissimi Christiani Frederici (1837) in which several new species were described and Bemærkninger om Danmarks Geologi : oplæste i det geologiske Selskab (1835).

References
A.S.H. Breure & A. González Guillen Bibliography of Cuban terrestrial Mollusca,
including related and biohistorical papers on Cuban malacology
Technical Bulletin Netherlands Centre for Biodiversity Naturalis 12; ISSN 1387-0211 pdf

1799 births
1863 deaths
Danish malacologists